Yuliia Biriukova (born 24 January 1998) is a Ukrainian professional racing cyclist, who currently rides for UAE Development Team. She rode in the women's road race event at the 2020 UCI Road World Championships.

Major results
2022
2nd Grand Prix Gazipaşa
2nd GP Mediterrennean

References

External links
 

1998 births
Living people
Ukrainian female cyclists
Place of birth missing (living people)
21st-century Ukrainian women